Aleksei Nikolayevich Golovin (born 29 March 1981) is a former Russian professional football player.

Club career
He played two seasons in the Russian Football National League for FC Fakel Voronezh and FC Dynamo Bryansk.

References

External links
 

1981 births
Living people
Russian footballers
Association football forwards
FC Fakel Voronezh players
FC Dynamo Bryansk players
Sportspeople from Voronezh